Edward A. Wachter (June 30, 1883 – March 12, 1966) was a professional basketball player.

Wachter, a native of Troy, New York, played for several professional teams, like the Troy Trojans, in his 25-year career. He later coached at several schools, including Harvard University. He was elected to the Basketball Hall of Fame in 1961.

References 
 Hall of Fame profile

External links 
Ed Wachter's World - more info

1883 births
1966 deaths
Albany Great Danes men's basketball coaches
American men's basketball coaches
American men's basketball players
Basketball coaches from New York (state)
Basketball players from New York (state)
Centers (basketball)
Harvard Crimson men's basketball coaches
Lafayette Leopards men's basketball coaches
Naismith Memorial Basketball Hall of Fame inductees
Sportspeople from Troy, New York